Joana Pedroso (born 6 February 1974) is a Portuguese former professional tennis player.

Pedroso was runner-up in the 1994 national singles championships to Sofia Prazeres, which whom she partnered to three national doubles championships. She was also a two-time national champion in mixed doubles.

While competing on the professional tour in the 1990s, Pedroso reached career best rankings of 488 in singles and 266 in doubles. She won two doubles titles on the ITF Women's Circuit. Between 1993 and 1997 she featured in 18 Fed Cup ties for Portugal, winning seven singles and nine doubles matches, from a total of 30 rubbers.

ITF finals

Doubles: 6 (2–4)

References

External links
 
 
 

1974 births
Living people
Portuguese female tennis players
20th-century Portuguese women